Twisting by the Pool is a 1983 song by British rock band Dire Straits which appears on ExtendedancEPlay. It was released as a single in 1983, peaking at No. 1 in New Zealand, No. 14 on the UK Singles Chart and at No. 12 on the US Billboard Top Tracks chart.

According to the sheet music published at Musicnotes.com by Universal Music Publishing Group, the song is set in the time signature of common time, with a tempo of 182 beats per minute. It is composed in the key of A major with Knopfler's vocal range spanning from A2 to E4. The song has a basic sequence of A–D–E as its chord progression.

William Ruhlmann of AllMusic retrospectively praised the song, calling it "the closest thing to exuberant rock & roll this seemingly humorless band had ever attempted."

Charts

Weekly charts

Year-end charts

See also
List of number-one singles from the 1980s (New Zealand)

References

1983 singles
1983 songs
Dire Straits songs
Number-one singles in New Zealand
Songs written by Mark Knopfler
Songs about dancing
Twist (dance)
Vertigo Records singles